Cash for Influence, Cash for Laws or Cash for Amendments  may refer to:

 Cash for Honours, 2006, 2007
 2009 cash for influence scandal
 2010 cash for influence scandal
 2011 cash for influence scandal

See also
 Cash for access (disambiguation)

de:Spendenaffäre